Uudam Sonam, also Wudamu (Уудам in Mongolian Cyrillic; born on September 9, 1999) is a Chinese singer of Mongol ethnicity, who participated in the 2011 season of China's Got Talent. He is also a former member of the Hulunbuir Children's Choir.

Background 
Uudam was born on September 9, 1999, in Hulunbuir in Inner Mongolia (Autonomous Region in northern China). His mother died in a road accident when he was eight years old. A few years later when he was eleven his father also died in another car accident. He was then fostered by Buren Bayaer, the director of the Hulunbuir Children's Choir which Uudam was part of and a noted Chinese singer. (Quintessenso Choir).

Buren and Wurina have two daughters, Nurma (alternately, Norma, Nurman, or Norman) and Enigma. Uudam also has a biological older sister named Sue Neil, who is around three years older than him.

Uudam attended Delta Secondary School (Delta, British Columbia) in Delta, Canada for two years until 2017.

Uudam goes by Kevin as his English name and also went by Michael for a few years. He now attends university in Canada.

China's Got Talent 
Uudam participated as a contestant in the 2011 season of China's Got Talent. Performing in his native Mongolian language, he sang the song, "Mother in the Dream". He also performed a song with his adoptive parents, Buren and Wurina Bayaer. He appeared in the background of Buren Bayaer's video, "Take Me To The Prairie" .

Discography 
 2011: "Mother far away" (chin. 梦中的额吉, "Meng zhong de eji" ) – Guangdong Audio B006G79YT4, CD (5 titles) + DVD (music video "Mother in the Dream")
The cover photo of this album
http://ent.southcn.com/8/images/attachement/jpg/site4/20111125/0016ec7d751a103941d448.jpg
Including 5 songs:Mother in the dream(梦中的额吉)

The running horse(奔驰的马)

A song dedicated to father(献给父亲的歌)

Uncle Bateer(巴特尔舅舅)

Taryat Miden (Thousand-Mile Express/Thousand-Kilometer Horse)(塔力雅图麦丹)

In 2015 he sang a new song,"Old mother(苍老的母亲)"on China's Got Talent's stage during  Chinese Spring Festival.
 (Music video "Mother in the Dream" (梦中的额吉) = (梦中的额吉)

Filmography 
 2011: The Men with Blue Dots (蓝斑人)(mong. Хөх толбот хүмүүс, "Hoh Tolbot Humuus") – as child Ganbaa
 2012: Night Blooming (chin. 隔窗有眼) (horror movie) – as the leading actor in the role of 小虎 (Xiao Hu, “Little Tiger”)
 2013: Uudam Charity Mini Movie "Spring-Bound School Bus" (开往春天的校车)(short movie)

References

External links

 
 乌达木Michael on Twitter
 乌达木Michael on Weibo
 乌达木Kevin on Instagram (official)

1999 births
People from Hulunbuir
Living people
Chinese child singers
Singers from Inner Mongolia
Chinese people of Mongolian descent
21st-century Chinese male singers